Cheryl Angelelli-Kornoelje is a retired American para swimmer, an Oakland University bachelor's degree's graduate and a motivational speaker. She was inducted into the Michigan Athletes with Disabilities Hall of Fame in 2000, and she was named Female Amateur Athlete of the Year by the State of Michigan twice, once in 2000 and once in 2003.

Biography
When Angelelli was a teenager, she sustained a spinal cord injury after breaking her neck from hitting her head on the bottom of the pool after diving off a starting block in 1983. She was practicing her start off the swimming block. She took up para swimming in 1998 in Detroit. She created a documentary film titled Untold Dreams to raise the awareness of the many abilities of disabled people and knowledge of the Paralympics as well as talking about her success in competitive swimming.

Angelelli retired from swimming in 2013 and switched to wheelchair ballroom dancing.

References

1968 births
Living people
Sportspeople from Michigan
Paralympic swimmers of the United States
Swimmers at the 2000 Summer Paralympics
Swimmers at the 2004 Summer Paralympics
Swimmers at the 2008 Summer Paralympics
Medalists at the 2004 Summer Paralympics
Medalists at the 2008 Summer Paralympics
Oakland University alumni
People with tetraplegia
Paralympic medalists in swimming
Paralympic silver medalists for the United States
Paralympic bronze medalists for the United States
American female freestyle swimmers
S4-classified Paralympic swimmers
Medalists at the World Para Swimming Championships
21st-century American women